Hot Head is a 1992 science fiction novel by English author Simon Ings. Part cyberpunk, part neo-noir, Ings attracted positive reviews from sci-fi enthusiasts for what was his debut novel.

Plot summary 
Malise Arnim, a European Muslim who became a cybernetically enhanced warrior was once the saviour of the world and everybody’s favourite heroine. However, once her skills had ceased to be useful the authorities removed her artificial enhancements and left her to sink or swim. Now, having been reduced to making porn films to survive, she is needed again as a huge artificial asteroid is heading for Earth and destroying everything in its path.

References 

1992 British novels
1992 science fiction novels
British science fiction novels
Cyberpunk novels
1992 debut novels
Grafton (publisher) books